The Vancouver Island Raiders are a Canadian Junior Football team based in Nanaimo, British Columbia. The Raiders play in the six-team B.C. Football Conference, which itself is part of the Canadian Junior Football League (CJFL) and competes annually for the national title known as the Canadian Bowl. After an aborted move of the Victoria Rebels to Nanaimo in late 2004, the Raiders were founded in 2005, and won the CJFL championship in 2006, 2008 and 2009. The Raiders also won consecutive BCFC titles from 2006 through 2011. Andrew Harris of the CFL's Winnipeg Blue Bombers played for the Raiders from 2006-2009.  The team still wears a Victoria Rebels logo on their helmet.

Coaches

Head Coach:Curtis Vizza

Defensive Coordinator:Karim Maher

Offensive
Coordinator:Colin Pippy

Executives

President:Kabel AtwallGeneral Manager:Josh WilliamsMarketing and Social Media Director:Zach Calman

History

External links
Vancouver Island Raiders homepage
Canadian Junior Football League

Canadian Junior Football League teams
Canadian football teams in British Columbia
Sports clubs established in 2005
2005 establishments in British Columbia
Sport in Nanaimo